Vozrozhdeniye is a rural locality (a settlement) in Semigorodneye Rural Settlement, Kharovsky District, Vologda Oblast, Russia. The population was 37 as of 2002.

Geography 
Vozrozhdeniye is located 36 km south of Kharovsk (the district's administrative centre) by road. Semigorodnyaya is the nearest rural locality.

References 

Rural localities in Kharovsky District